Helen Va'aga (born 11 August 1977) is a former New Zealand rugby union player. She made her international debut for the Black Ferns against Germany at the 2002 Rugby World Cup in Spain.

Va'aga featured for the Black Ferns against a World XV's team in 2003. In 2005, she played in a test against England at Eden Park. She was part of the Black Ferns squad that won the 2006 Rugby World Cup.

In 2009, Va'aga coached the Iranian women's team.

References

External links
Black Ferns Profile

1977 births
Living people
New Zealand women's international rugby union players
New Zealand female rugby union players